Altofts is a village in West Yorkshire, England. The M62 runs close to the village to the north-east, and the Aire and Calder Navigation to the north-west.

The village is part of the civil parish of Normanton, but for local elections it is part of the ward of Altofts and Whitwood, which also includes the western part of Castleford.

Economy
Many people in the village previously worked in the local coal mines. The largest mine in the village, The West Riding Colliery, was owned by Pope and Pearsons. It was here that the first British coaldust experiments took place during 1908 and 1909, conducted by W. E. Garforth, manager of the colliery and president of the Mining Association of Great Britain. In the early 20th century Garforth's improvement to worker safety helped to develop underground safety and rescue procedures that are today common worldwide. Today people are either employed in neighbouring towns and cities, or on the Wakefield Europort's 'Tuscany Park' industrial estate which has been developed over recent decades.

Altofts' brickworks, Normanton Brick Co Ltd, moved to its present Greenfield Road site from Wakefield Road in the late 1990s. It ran under Thomas Kirk's great grandsons until it stopped production in 2011.

Community facilities
The village has four pubs: The Horse and Jockey, Miners Arms, The Poplar, and the Robin Hood.

The Horse and Jockey is the oldest pub in the village.

The Robin Hood serves at least four cask ales and is Wakefield Campaign for Real Ales Autumn Pub of the Season 2015. A microbrewery at the back of the Robin Hood called Tarn51 Brewing Co produces beers to serve in the pub and to the local pubs.

There are two Working Men's Clubs one of which has been converted into a community centre called The Brig. The Brig is owned by the registered charity called Altofts Community & Sports Foundation Ltd.

The Brig is home to many community groups including Altofts Juniors FC, Altofts Cycling Club, Readers group and Storytime.

The Altofts Book Swap is also based at The Brig.

The Brig hosts an annual summer gala to promote local talent and community groups.

In the village there is also a post office, a butchers and a small number of shops and farms.

Landmarks
Lower Altofts is an area at the lower end of the village. It had the longest unbroken row of three-storey terraced houses in Europe, Silkstone Row, until 1978 when it was demolished. There are now just two shorter rows of terraced houses in Lower Altofts on Pope Street.

Education
Altofts schools are Lee Brigg Infants School, Martin Frobisher Infants School, and Altofts Junior school which celebrated its 30th anniversary in 2008.

Religious sites

There are three churches. Altofts Methodist Church, opened in 1990, was built when the three Methodist congregations from Lower Altofts, Lock Lane and Upper Altofts amalgamated. The church is located on Church Road. The Church of St Mary Magdalene is the Anglican parish church for the village, and is Anglo-Catholic in tradition. The Hebron is an independent church, also located on Church Road.

Sport

Altofts Community Sports Club and playing fields provide for cricket, football and bowls. The Cricket Club plays at Lock Lane and is in the Bradford Cricket League.
Altofts AFC, which was founded in the 1890s, plays in the West Yorkshire Association Football League.

Notable people

John Freeston, Tudor barrister and benefactor; lived in Altofts for most of his life.
Martin Frobisher, Elizabethan sea captain and adventurer, credited with the discovery of Frobisher Bay in Canada; born in Altofts

References

External links

Villages in West Yorkshire
Geography of the City of Wakefield
Normanton, West Yorkshire